Paso del Molino (Mill's Crossing) is a barrio (neighbourhood or district) of Montevideo, capital of Uruguay.

External links 
 Official Site

Barrios of Montevideo